John Francis Parker (May 29, 1907-December 1992) was an American politician who was the last of a long line of part-time mayors of Taunton, Massachusetts. By his efforts the City Council decided to make the position full-time. Parker was elected to the State Senate in 1953, and served for many years as the Minority Leader of the Massachusetts Senate, the post he held when he retired from public life in 1989.  He was also a member of the Taunton School Committee.

Parker desired to succeed Congressman Joseph William Martin Jr. (R-MA) in the U.S. House of Representatives, however Parker refused to oppose the elderly former Speaker in the Republican primary of 1968. Martin was defeated in the primary by Governor’s Councilor Margaret Heckler (R-MA) effectively ending Parker's efforts of attaining higher office.

A middle school within the city is named in honor of his service to the city, and a section of U.S. Route 44 is named in honor of Parker and his wife, Mae, who had no children.
The Taunton Municipal Golf Course was changed to the John F. Parker Municipal Golf Course.

See also 
 Massachusetts legislature: 1953–1954, 1955–1956, 1957–1958, 1959–1960, 1961–1962, 1963–1964, 1965–1966, 1967–1968, 1969–1970, 1971–1972, 1973–1974, 1975–1976, 1977–1978, 1979–1980, 1981–1982, 1983–1984, 1985–1986, 1987–1988

Notes

Further reading
 . ("New Legislators' Orientation, State House, Boston")

1907 births
1992 deaths
Massachusetts state senators
Mayors of Taunton, Massachusetts
Massachusetts Republican Party chairs
20th-century American politicians